The Théodat River is a tributary of Evans Lake, in Regional County Municipality (MRC) of Eeyou Istchee Baie-James (municipality), in the administrative region from Nord-du-Québec, Canadian province of Quebec, in Canada.

The surface of the river is usually frozen from early November to mid-May, however, safe ice circulation is generally from mid-November to mid-April.

Geography 
The main hydrographic slopes near the Théodat River are:
North side: Poles River, La Marte River, Nemiscau River, Le Gardeur Lake;
East side: Broadback River, Assinica River;
South side: Salamandre River, Broadback River, Nipukatasi River;
West side: Evans Lake, Broadback River, Chabinoche River.

The Theodat River originates at the mouth of a little unidentified lake (length:  altitude). This source is located at:
 Northeast of the mouth of the Théodat River;
 Northeast of the mouth of Evans Lake;
 Northeast of Soscumica Lake;
 East of the mouth of the Broadback River);
 Northeast of downtown Matagami.

From its source, the Théodat River flows on  according to the following segments:

Upper part of Theodat River (segment of  crossing the Assinica Wildlife Sanctuary)
 southwesterly to the East shore of Hobier Lake;
 Westward across Hobier Lake to its mouth;
 Northeast, to a creek (coming from the East);
 West, to the outlet (coming from the South) of an unidentified lake;
 Westerly, to the discharge (coming from the North) of an unidentified lake;
 Northwesterly to the dump (coming from the East) of an unidentified lake;
 to the West, to the East bank of an unidentified lake;
 to the North, in particular by crossing on an unidentified lake  at the beginning of the segment, up to a small bay on the South shore of the Eastern part of Théodat Lake;

Lower part of Théodat River (segment of )
 Westerly across the Théodat Lake, up to at the dam at its mouth;
 West through marsh areas, forming a curve to the North and a Southwesterly hook at the end of the segment, to the East shore of a unidentified lake;
 Westward, crossing at the beginning of the segment on an unidentified lake up to at the end of a bay on the South shore of Le Gardeur Lake;
 Northwesterly across Le Gardeur Lake, up to its mouth;
 North crossing over a small unidentified lake to its mouth.

Evans Lake is crossed to the North by the Broadback River.

The mouth of Théodat River is located at:
 East of the mouth of Evans Lake (confluence with the Broadback River);
 Northeast of Soscumica Lake;
 East of the mouth of the Broadback River;
 North of downtown Matagami.

Toponymy 
The toponym "Théodat River" was formalized on December 5, 1968, at the Commission de toponymie du Québec, i.e. at the creation of this commission

References

See also 
James Bay
Rupert Bay
Broadback River, a watercourse
Evans Lake, a body of water
Théodat Lake, a body of water
Assinica Wildlife Sanctuary, a protected area
List of rivers of Quebec

Rivers of Nord-du-Québec